"What We're All About" (titled "It's What We're All About" on the single cover) is a song by Canadian rock band Sum 41. It was released in April 2002 as a single for the soundtrack to the film Spider-Man.

Background
This is a reworked version of "Dave's Possessed Hair/ What We're all About" from the band's first EP, Half Hour of Power. Part of the first verse is rapped in an acappella version in the beginning of the "Fat Lip" music video. Similar to "Fat Lip", vocal duties in "What We're All About" are split evenly between rhythm guitarist Deryck Whibley, drummer Stevo Jocz, and lead guitarist Dave Brownsound. The song segues into the 55-second instrumental track, "Ride the Chariot to the Devil", on the EP version of the song.

Music video
The music video was directed by Marc Klasfeld and premiered in mid-2002. It features the band playing upside-down with their instruments chained to the roof as they perform on the rooftop to the crowd below. Throughout the video, various clips of the Spider-Man movie play, and in the middle of the performance, Kerry King of the thrash metal band Slayer is featured in the music video and performs the guitar solo in the song.

Track listing
 "It's What We're All About"
 "Handle This" (live version)

Personnel
Sum 41
Bizzy D – lead vocals, rhythm guitar
Stevo 32 – co-lead vocals, drums, percussion
Dave Brownsound – co-lead vocals, lead guitar
Cone – bass guitar, backing vocals

Additional musician
Kerry King – guitar solo

Charts

References

External links

2002 singles
Sum 41 songs
Music videos directed by Marc Klasfeld
Rapcore songs
Rap rock songs
2002 songs
Island Records singles
Songs written by Steve Jocz
Songs written by Deryck Whibley
Songs written by Dave Baksh
Songs from Spider-Man films
Spider-Man (2002 film series)